The Lost Volcano is a 1950 American adventure film. It was the third in the 12-film Bomba, the Jungle Boy series.

Plot
The parents of a young boy think Bomba is just an imaginary friend of their son's. Luckily, they learn differently after the boy is kidnapped by a pair of crooked jungle guides who are searching for a lost city's treasure. Bomba [Johnny Sheffield] rescues the boy, battles a croc, and with the help of an erupting volcano and a python, finishes off the bad guys.

Cast
 Johnny Sheffield as Bomba
 Donald Woods as Paul Gordon
 Marjorie Lord as Ruth Gordon
 John Ridgely as Fred Barton
 Tommy Ivo as David Gordon 
 Elena Verdugo as Nona 
 Don C. Harvey as Fred Higgins (as Don Harvey)
 Grandon Rhodes as Dr. Charles Langley
 Robert Lewis as Daniel

Reception
"The Production is a small boy's paradise", said the Los Angeles Times adding that "Tarzan now has a formidable rival in Bomba."

References

External links

1950 films
American adventure films
Films directed by Ford Beebe
Films produced by Walter Mirisch
Monogram Pictures films
1950 adventure films
American black-and-white films
1950s English-language films
1950s American films